The Year's Best Science Fiction: Eighteenth Annual Collection is a science fiction anthology edited by Gardner Dozois that was published in 2001.  It is the 18th in The Year's Best Science Fiction series and won a 2002 Locus Award for best anthology.

Contents

The book includes a 39-page summation of the year by Dozois, 23 stories that first appeared in 2000 (each with a two-paragraph introduction by the editor), and a seven-page referenced list of honorable mentions for the year. 

The stories are as follows:

John Kessel: "The Juniper Tree"
Charles Stross: "Antibodies" (also collected in Toast: And Other Rusted Futures)
Ursula K. Le Guin: "The Birthday Of the World" (also collected in The Birthday of the World and Other Stories)
Nancy Kress: "Savior"
Paul J. McAuley: "Reef"
Susan Palwick: "Going After Bobo"
Albert E. Cowdrey: "Crux"
Severna Park: "The Cure For Everything"
Peter F. Hamilton: "The Suspect Genome"
Michael Swanwick: "The Raggle Taggle Gypsy-o"
Lucius Shepard: "The Radiant Green Star"
Alastair Reynolds: "Great Wall of Mars"
Eliot Fintushel: "Milo and Sylvie"
Brian Stableford: "Snowball In Hell"
Stephen Baxter: "On the Orion Line"
Greg Egan: "Oracle"
Rick Cook and Ernest Hogan: "Obsidian Harvest"
Tananarive Due: "Patient Zero"
Charles Stross: "A Colder War"
Steven Utley: "The Real World"
M. Shayne Bell: "The Thing About Benny"
Robert Charles Wilson: "The Great Goodbye"
Ian McDonald: "Tendeléo's Story"

References

2001 anthologies
18
St. Martin's Press books